The Paixhans gun (French: Canon Paixhans) was the first naval gun designed to fire explosive shells. It was developed by the French general Henri-Joseph Paixhans in 1822–1823. The design furthered the evolution of naval artillery into the modern age. Its use presaged the end of wood as the preferred material in naval warships, and the rise of the ironclad.

Background
Explosive shells had long been in use in ground warfare (in howitzers and mortars) and on bomb vessels against stationary targets, but they were fired only at high angles and with relatively low velocities. The shells of that time were inherently dangerous to handle, and no method had been found to safely fire the explosive shells with the high power and flatter trajectory of a high-velocity gun.

However, before the advent of radar and modern optical controlled firing, high trajectories were not practical for ship-to-ship combat. Such combat essentially required flat-trajectory guns in order to have a reasonable chance of hitting the target. Therefore, ship-to-ship combat had consisted for centuries of encounters between flat-trajectory cannons using inert cannonballs, which could inflict only local damage, even on wooden hulls.

Mechanism
Paixhans advocated using flat-trajectory shell guns against warships in 1822 in his Nouvelle force maritime et artillerie.

Paixhans developed a delaying mechanism that, for the first time, allowed shells to be fired safely in high-powered flat-trajectory guns. The effect of explosive shells lodging into wooden hulls and then detonating was potentially devastating. Henri-Joseph Paixhans first demonstrated this in trials against the two-decker Pacificateur in 1824, in which he successfully broke up the ship. Two prototype Paixhans guns had been cast in 1823 and 1824 for this test. Paixhans reported the results in Experiences faites sur une arme nouvelle. The shells had a fuze that ignited automatically when the gun was fired; they lodged in the wooden hull of the target, and exploded a moment later:

The first Paixhans guns for the French Navy were made in 1841. The barrel of the guns weighed about 10,000 lbs. (4.5 metric tons), and proved accurate to about two miles. In the 1840s, France, Britain, Russia, and the United States adopted the new naval guns.

The effect of the guns in an operational context was first demonstrated during the actions at Veracruz in 1838, at Campeche in 1843, Eckernförde in 1849 during the Danish–Prussian War, and especially at the Battle of Sinop in 1853 during the Crimean War. The Naval Battle of Campeche made history because it was the first time both sides used explosive shells and the only time sailing ships defeated steamers.

According to the Penny Cyclopaedia (1858):

Development
While the idea was notable in the advance of artillery, metallurgy had not advanced to the level needed for safe operation. The naval guns of this type were known for catastrophic failures: the chambers would burst in use. The long shells and large blackpowder charges needed to propel the shells put a stress on cast-iron cannon that often could not be contained. Further work by John A. Dahlgren, and Thomas Jackson Rodman improved the weapon to use both solid shot and shell safely.

Adoption

France
In 1827 the French navy ordered fifty large guns on the Paixhans model from the arsenals at Ruelle and at Indret near Nantes. The gun chosen, the canon-obusier de 80, was so called because it was of the 22 cm bore diameter which would have fired an 80-pound solid shot. The gun barrel weighed 3600 kg and the bore was of 223 mm diameter and 2.8 m long, firing a shell weighing 23.12 kg. The guns were produced slowly and were tested afloat through the 1830s. They formed a small part of the armament on larger ships, with only two or four guns being carried, although on smaller, experimental steam vessels they, and the much larger canon-obusier de 150 of 27 cm bore, were proportionately more important. The paddle steamer Météore, for example, carried three canon-obusier de 80 pieces and six small carronades in 1833. Alongside the large guns which Paixhans had called for, the French navy also used a smaller shell gun, of the same 164 mm bore as its standard solid shot-firing 30 pounder guns and carronades, in larger numbers with first rate ships carrying over 30 of these guns.

United States
The United States Navy adopted the design, and equipped several ships with 8-inch guns of 63 and 55 cwt. in 1845, and later a 10-inch shell gun of 86 cwt. Paixhans guns were used on USS Constitution (four Paixhans guns) in 1842, under the command of Foxhall A. Parker, Sr., USS Constellation in 1854, and were also installed on the USS Mississippi (10 Paixhans guns), and USS Susquehanna (six Paixhans guns) during Commodore Perry's mission to open Japan in 1853.

The Dahlgren gun was developed by John A. Dahlgren in 1846, with advantages over Paixhans guns:

Russia
The Russian Navy was the first to use the guns extensively in combat. At the Battle of Sinop in 1853, Russian ships attacked and annihilated a Turkish fleet with their Paixhans explosive shell guns. The shells penetrated deep inside the wooden planking of Turkish ships, exploding and igniting the hulls. The defeat was instrumental in convincing the naval powers of the shell's efficacy, and hastened the development of the ironclad to counter it.

Notes

Naval guns of France
American Civil War artillery